Howard Lapsley Baldwin (born May 14, 1942) is an American entrepreneur and film producer. He is the CEO of Baldwin Entertainment, which has produced films such as the Academy Award-nominated Ray.  Baldwin founded the New England Whalers ice hockey franchise in the World Hockey Association (WHA) and retained ownership when the team became the Hartford Whalers and joined the National Hockey League (NHL). He has also owned part of the Minnesota North Stars and Pittsburgh Penguins NHL franchises. He won the Stanley Cup in 1992 with Pittsburgh. The WHA's coach of the year award was originally named the Howard Baldwin Trophy in his honor.

Professional ice hockey

Connecticut ice hockey

Baldwin has had a long-standing involvement with ice hockey in Connecticut since the early 1970s, starting with the WHA's New England Whalers/NHL's Hartford Whalers, then with the Hartford Wolf Pack/Connecticut Whale of the American Hockey League (AHL), and finally with the Connecticut Whale of the Premier Hockey Federation (PHF).

New England/Hartford Whalers

Baldwin became one of the youngest executives in professional sports when he became a founder and partner of the WHA's Boston-based New England Whalers in 1971 at the age of 28. Five years later he was president of the league. The Whalers first season in the WHA was a success both on and off the ice with coach Jack Kelley's team winning the 1973 AVCO World Cup Championship.  Kelley was also the very first recipient of a trophy named after Baldwin, the WHA's coach of the year award.

In 1974, Baldwin determined that the team needed its own building as the Whalers had been sharing the Boston Garden arena with the NHL's Boston Bruins. He moved the Whalers from Boston to Hartford's new Civic Center Coliseum, a vehicle for the revitalization of downtown Hartford, with the team playing their first game there in 1975. In 1979 Baldwin guided the WHA into a historic merger with the NHL with his New England Whalers making the transition to the more established league after their identity was changed to the Hartford Whalers. Baldwin served as the managing general partner of the Whalers until the team was sold to local ownership in 1988.

Hartford Wolf Pack/Connecticut Whale
In 2009, Baldwin founded Hartford Hockey LLC, better known as Whalers Sports & Entertainment, to promote ice hockey throughout Connecticut.  In August 2010, Whalers Sports and Entertainment was hired by the NHL's New York Rangers to manage the day-to-day business and marketing affairs for their AHL affiliate the Hartford Wolf Pack. As part of the marketing agreement, the minor league team was renamed the Connecticut Whale, as a tribute to the former Hartford Whalers team.

Women's Hockey
Baldwin licensed the name Connecticut Whale to a franchise of the Premier Hockey Federation, a founding member of the 2015 upstart league.

Whalers Hockey Fest
In the early 2010s Baldwin organized the "Whalers Hockey Fest", an outdoor ice hockey festival which featured "up to 20 minor league, college, high school, and youth hockey games at a rink...built at Rentschler Field, the University of Connecticut's football stadium in East Hartford".

Other teams

Baldwin created the San Jose Sharks as an expansion team, later taking a controlling interest in the Minnesota North Stars, and before later purchasing the Pittsburgh Penguins, all of which are NHL ice hockey teams. At one time, he held a 50% interest in the Moscow Red Army team. 

He became involved with the American Hockey League, a player development league affiliated with the NHL, forming the Wilkes-Barre/Scranton Penguins in Pennsylvania, and Manchester Monarchs in New Hampshire. Baldwin was a founding investor in the World Football League and was to own a franchise in Boston, Massachusetts, but pulled out of the league before its inaugural 1974 season began.

Pittsburgh Penguins

Baldwin's specialty was buying franchises with very little of his own money invested. For example, his actual cash investment in the Penguins was just $1,000. The rest was assumed debt and capital provided by other partners. His purchase of the Penguins was bankrolled largely by Morris Belzberg.  Baldwin served as the Penguins chairman of the board and represented the club on the NHL Board of Governors. Under his direction the Penguins won the Stanley Cup, one Patrick Division regular season title, four Northeast Division titles, and one President's Trophy.

Baldwin and his partners created The American Hockey League expansion franchise in Wilkes-Barre, Pennsylvania in 1999 as the minor league affiliate of the NHL Penguins. When Belzberg left the ownership group, Baldwin recruited Roger Marino, a Boston investor. By that time, the Penguins were struggling financially and wound up declaring bankruptcy in November 1998.

Honors
In 2010, he was elected as an inaugural inductee into the World Hockey Association Hall of Fame in the builders category.

Baldwin Entertainment Group

In addition to his interest in professional hockey, Baldwin has also enjoyed a successful career in film as a producer with his wife and producing partner, Karen Mulvihill Baldwin. The Baldwins produced such films as Mystery, Alaska, Odd Man Rush, Sudden Death, From the Hip, Spellbinder, and Joshua, among others.

References

External links
 
 Baldwin Entertainment

1942 births
Living people
Film producers from New York (state)
Businesspeople from New York City
Hartford Whalers executives
Minnesota North Stars executives
National Hockey League executives
National Hockey League owners
Pittsburgh Penguins owners
San Jose Sharks personnel
Stanley Cup champions
Boston Bulls